A ribfest (short for rib festival), sometimes called a rib cook-off, is a type of food festival that occurs throughout the United States and Canada.

Background
The size of each ribfest is often measured by the number of traveling professional "rib teams" which sell food and compete at the events.

A rib festival generally has multiple food vendors selling barbecue beef or pork ribs, pulled pork sandwiches, chicken, coleslaw, baked beans, and other related food choices. The vendors usually compete against one another for top spot in several categories including: Best Ribs, Best Sauce, Best Pulled Pork, and the Peoples Choice Award.

The rib festivals often coincide with music festivals, such as the "Dallas Ribfest Gospel BBQ", or Cleveland's "Great American Rib Cook-off & Music Festival".

After 30 years, Ribfest in St. Petersburg, Florida celebrated its final event in 2019. The festival raised nearly $4.5 million for local non-profits throughout the years.

Notable ribfests

 Canada's Largest Ribfest – Burlington, Ontario
 Best in the West Nugget Rib Cook-off – Sparks, Nevada
 London Ribfest – London, Ontario
 Toronto Ribfest – Etobicoke, Toronto, Ontario, Canada
 Naperville Ribfest - Naperville, Illinois
 Canada's largest Halal Barbeque and Fast Food Truck Festival – Toronto, Ontario

References

Food and drink festivals in the United States
Food and drink festivals in Canada
Food and drink festivals